SM UB-9 was a German Type UB I submarine or U-boat in the German Imperial Navy during World War I. UB-9 was ordered in October 1914 and was laid down at the AG Weser shipyard in Bremen in November. She carried two torpedoes for her two bow torpedo tubes and was also armed with a deck-mounted machine gun. She was launched and commissioned as SM UB-9 in February 1915.

UB-9s commanding officer at commissioning only remained in charge of the ship for a week. Sources do not report any more commanding officers assigned through the end of the war, so it's not clear if the submarine remained in commission. UB-9 was reported in use as a training vessel at Kiel in September 1915. The U-boat made no war patrols and sank no ships during the war, which may indicate that the vessel remained in a training role. At the end of the war, UB-9 was deemed unseaworthy and unable to surrender at Harwich with the rest of Germany's U-boat fleet. She remained in Germany where she was broken up by Dräger at Lübeck in 1919.

Design and construction 
After the German Army's rapid advance along the North Sea coast in the earliest stages of World War I, the German Imperial Navy found itself without suitable submarines that could be operated in the narrow and shallow seas off Flanders. Project 34, a design effort begun in mid-August 1914, produced the Type UB I design: a small submarine that could be shipped by rail to a port of operations and quickly assembled.

UB-9 was the first of the initial allotment of seven submarines—numbered up to —ordered on 15 October from AG Weser of Bremen, just shy of two months after planning for the class began. UB-9 was laid down by Weser in Bremen on 6 November. She had a single  Körting 4-cylinder diesel engine for surface travel, and a single  Siemens-Schuckert electric motor for underwater travel, both attached to a single propeller shaft.

UB-9 was armed with two  torpedoes in two bow torpedo tubes. She was also outfitted for a single  machine gun on deck. UB-9s standard complement consisted of one officer and thirteen enlisted men. After work on UB-9 was complete at the Weser yard, she was launched on 6 February 1915.

Career 
The submarine was commissioned into the German Imperial Navy as SM UB-9 on 18 February 1915 under the command of Oberleutnant zur See Wilhelm Werner, a 26-year-old first-time U-boat commander. Wenninger was only in command of UB-9 for ten days. Sources do not indicate who, if anyone, succeeded him as commander of UB-9, or if UB-9 remained in commission.

According to authors R. H. Gibson and Maurice Prendergast, UB-9 had been assigned to the Kiel Periscope School by September 1915. Uboat.net reports that UB-9' undertook no war patrols and had no successes against enemy ships, which may indicate that the vessel remained in use only as a training vessel.

At the end of the war, the Allies required all German U-boats to be sailed to Harwich for surrender. UB-9'' was broken up by Dräger at Lübeck in 1919.

Notes

References

Bibliography 

 

 
 
 
 
 
 

German Type UB I submarines
Ships built in Bremen (state)
1915 ships
U-boats commissioned in 1915
World War I submarines of Germany